Qaçaq Kərəm (until 1992, Oraq-Çəkic) is a village in the municipality of Xətai in the Agstafa Rayon of Azerbaijan.

References

Populated places in Aghstafa District